Herbert Hoover High School is a public secondary school in the Fresno Unified School District serving Fresno, California, United States, in northern Fresno County. It is named for Herbert Hoover, the 31st President of the United States.

Performance
The school achieved an API index of 697 in 2008.

Notable alumni
 Henry Ellard (class of 1979) - NFL wide receiver, state champion in the triple jump
 Eric Kendricks (class of 2010) - 2014 Dick Butkus Award winner
 Mychal Kendricks (class of 2008) - NFL linebacker for the Philadelphia Eagles, Seattle Seahawks, and San Francisco 49ers
 Barbara Morgan (class of 1969) - NASA astronaut, Teacher in Space Project
 Rod Perry (class of 1971) - former NFL defensive back for the Los Angeles Rams
 Tyrone "Tye" Waller (class of 1975) former Major League Baseball player and coach St. Louis Cardinals Chicago Cubs San Diego Padres Oakland Athletics
 Ryan Wetnight (class of 1989) former Tight End in NFL for Chicago Bears and Green Bay Packers
 Dan Boitano (class of 1971) former Major League Baseball journeyman pitcher
 Ron Dunn (class of 1967) former Major League Baseball player

References

External links
 

High schools in Fresno, California
Public high schools in California
1963 establishments in California
Educational institutions established in 1963